Beschlossen und verkündet (Resolved and Proclaimed) is a German legal television series starring Hans Söhnker, Dieter Kursawe and Horst Keitel. 13 episodes were aired in 1975. It was the continuation of the series Lokaltermin (1973), which had a similar setting.

Plot
The series is about a Berlin district court around 1900 where court hearings are held. Whether it is about theft, spiritualism or the "red socialists" - there is always enough to do for district judge Schröter and clerk Wutzke.

Cast
 Hans Söhnker: District Judge Schröter
 Dieter Kursawe: Clerk Wutzke
 Horst Keitel: Public Prosecutor Böck
 Monika Peitsch
 Harald Juhnke
 Harald Leipnitz
 Walter Richter
 Marianne Pohlenz
 Jürgen Janza
 Peer Schmidt
 Ingrid Steeger
 Claus Wilcke
 Gustl Bayrhammer
 Michaela May
 Edith Hancke
 Thomas Fritsch
 Theo Lingen
 Stefan Behrens
 Hans Jürgen Diedrich
 Robert Dietl
 Günter Glaser
 Hans Hessling
 Oscar Sabo
 Peter Schiff
 Friedrich Schoenfelder
 Richard Süssenguth
 Guido Weber

See also
Lokaltermin (1973)
List of German television series

External links
 

German crime television series
1975 German television series debuts
1975 German television series endings
German-language television shows
Sequel television series
ZDF original programming
German legal television series